Tillery-Fries House, also known as Conoconnara Hall, The Mansion, and Oak Grove, is a historic plantation complex located near Tillery, Halifax County, North Carolina. The Federal-style main house was built about 1800, and enlarged and remodeled about 1891 in the Colonial Revival style.  It is a large, two-story with attic gable-roofed, frame dwelling with a two-story wing.  It features full-facade one-story porches at the front and rear of the house supported by full Tuscan order columns.  Also on the property are the contributing smokehouse, dairy, storage shed, overseer's house (c. 1800), and manager's cottage.

It was listed on the National Register of Historic Places in 1992.

References

Plantation houses in North Carolina
Houses on the National Register of Historic Places in North Carolina
Federal architecture in North Carolina
Colonial Revival architecture in North Carolina
Houses completed in 1800
Houses in Halifax County, North Carolina
National Register of Historic Places in Halifax County, North Carolina